Arthur Eric Christoffelsz CMG (born 12 August 1890, death date unknown) was a Ceylonese who served as President of the Ceylon Board of Control for Cricket from 1950 to 1952. Ceylon's Principal Collector of Customs, he was made a Companion of the Order of St Michael and St George in the 1949 New Year Honours. He married Edith Daniels in Kandy in 1927.

References

1890 births
Year of death missing
Alumni of Royal College, Colombo
Burgher sportspeople
Sri Lankan people of Dutch descent
Ceylonese Companions of the Order of St Michael and St George
Sri Lankan cricket administrators
Members of Gray's Inn